West Busselton is a suburb of the Western Australian city of Busselton. At the 2021 census, it had a population of 8,869.
 
Buildings from the 1850s, 1860s, and 1870s in the suburb include Broadwater Homestead, the home of Alfred Bussell, "the Gulch", a police residence, bond store and custom officer's residence, and Phoebe Abbey's House. West Busselton was a residential area by the 1930s. West Busselton Primary School was established in 1965. The suburb also contains a government high school, Busselton Senior High School, along with two private schools, St Mary MacKillop College and Cornerstone Christian College. The Busselton Health Campus is in West Busselton.

References

Suburbs of Busselton